Frank Desbarres Fogwill (November 21, 1902 – February 24, 1974) was an electrician, labour leader and politician in Newfoundland. He represented St. John's East in the Newfoundland House of Assembly from 1949 to 1956.

He was born in St. John's and was educated at Centenary Hall. Fogwill worked as an electrician in the Reid Newfoundland Company railway shop. He was a founding member of the St. John's local for the Brotherhood of Railway Carmen and served as its first president. He was a delegate to the convention which founded the Newfoundland Trades and Labour Council, later the Newfoundland and Labrador Federation of Labour, and served on its St. John's executive.

Fogwill was elected to the Newfoundland National Convention in 1946 for St. John's East Extern. He supported the Responsible Government League and was opposed to confederation with Canada. Fogwill was elected to the Newfoundland assembly in 1949 and re-elected in 1951, retiring in 1956. He ran unsuccessfully for the riding of St. John's Centre in 1959. Fogwill died in St. John's in 1974.

References 

1902 births
1974 deaths
Trade unionists from Newfoundland and Labrador
Politicians from St. John's, Newfoundland and Labrador
Newfoundland National Convention members
Progressive Conservative Party of Newfoundland and Labrador MHAs